2016 Your World Awards is the fifth annual award hosted by Telemundo, which awarded prizes to the beauty, music and telenovela. It aired on August 25, 2016, at 7pm/6c.

Winners and nominees

Novelas / Súper Series

Variety

Music

Special awards
Estrella de Tu Mundo - Ana Maria Polo
El Poder En Ti - Intocable

References 

Telemundo original programming
Premios
Premios Tu Mundo